Gerald A. Lunz (March 13, 1903 - January 11, 1974) was an American football player who played for the Chicago Cardinals and Frankford Yellow Jackets in 1925, 1926, and 1930 in the National Football League. He played at the collegiate level at Marquette University.

See also
List of Frankford Yellow Jackets players

References

Chicago Cardinals players
Frankford Yellow Jackets players
Players of American football from Milwaukee
Marquette Golden Avalanche football players
1903 births
1974 deaths